USS Thomas (DE-102) was a Cannon class destroyer escort in the United States Navy during World War II. She was laid down by Dravo Corp., Pittsburgh, Pa., on 16 January 1943; launched on 31 July 1943; and commissioned on 21 November 1943.

She was the second United States Navy ship to be named after Clarence Crase Thomas.

History
Thomas operated off the east coast during World War II, and was involved in the sinking of three German submarines: U-709, U-233, and U-879. U-233 was rammed by the Thomas after being forced to the surface by depth charges.  Thomas rescued 29 survivors, including the Captain.

After being decommissioned at Green Cove Springs, Florida in March 1946, Thomas was transferred to the Republic of China Navy on 29 October 1948 and renamed Tai Ho (DE-23). Her name was deleted from the US Naval List on 22 December 1948.

"Tai Ho" was involved in a standdown on 30 September 1949 with three American merchant ships of the Isbrandtsen Line off Shanghai. This was part of the port closure actions by ROC government against communist controlled ports since June 1949. One American skipper radioed that an "armed ship was menacing" his vessel. Eventually the ROC vessel pulled away without further action.

Tai Ho escaped to Taiwan in 1949 with Nationalist forces.  She was stricken from the Republic of China Naval List in 1972 and broken up for scrap.

Honors
DE-102 received four battle stars for World War II service.

Notes

References

External links

 NavSource Online: USS Thomas (DE 102)

Cannon-class destroyer escorts of the United States Navy
Ships built in Pittsburgh
1943 ships
World War II frigates and destroyer escorts of the United States
Cannon-class destroyer escorts of the Republic of China Navy